Republic Square station is a planned underground light rail station in Austin Texas. It is the point furthest south on the system where the Blue and Orange Lines share stations. Initially planned to be located immediately beneath Republic Square, the station location was changed to be further north on Guadalupe Avenue. It is in the Downtown Transit Tunnel.

References

Future Capital MetroRail stations
Buildings and structures in Austin, Texas
Proposed railway stations in the United States
Railway stations scheduled to open in 2029
Railway stations located underground in the United States